Tawfig F. AlRabiah (Arabic: توفيق بن فوزان الربيعة) (born 26 October 1965) is the current Minister of Hajj and Umrah for Saudi Arabia. He served as Minister of Health from May 2016 until October 2021 when he became Minister of Hajj. He was the Minister of Commerce and Industry from December 2011 to May 2016.

Early life and education
AlRabiah was born in Riyadh, Saudi Arabia, on 26 October 1965 . In 1986, he graduated with a bachelor's degree from the College of Business at the King Saud University (KSU).  He studied at the University of Pittsburgh, where he attained his first master's degree in Information Science in 1990. He received his second master's degree in computer science in 1995. He studied for a Ph.D. in Computer Science. He graduated in 1999.

He worked as an assistant professor at King Saud University between 1999 and 2002.

Political career
From 2002 to 2007, he was director-general of the Saudi Arabian General Investment Authority. In 2007, he became director-general for Saudi Authority for Industrial Cities and Technology Zones (MODON).

Minister of Commerce and Industry (2011-2016)
AlRabiah became a member of the Council of Ministers in Saudi Arabia when he was appointed Minister of Commerce and Industry in 2011. During his tenure, he was on the council for a number of subsidiary economic councils, including Member of the Supreme Petroleum & Minerals Council, member of the board of directors of General Investment Fund, and Member of the General Committee for the Council of Ministers. He served on all three between 2011 and 2015.

Minister of Health (2016-2021)
AlRabiah was Saudi Arabian Minister of Health from 2016 to 2021.

Personal life
AlRabiah is married to Maha Muhammad Alsayari. They have five children.

References

Tawfig
1965 births
Health ministers of Saudi Arabia
Industry ministers of Saudi Arabia
Trade ministers of Saudi Arabia
King Saud University alumni
Academic staff of King Saud University
Living people
People from Riyadh
University of Pittsburgh alumni